Casielles is one of nine parishes (administrative divisions) in Ponga, a municipality within the province and autonomous community of Asturias, in northern Spain.

The population is 16 (INE 2011).

References

Parishes in Ponga